The 2019 Uttlesford District Council election took place on 2 May 2019 to elect members of Uttlesford District Council in England. This was on the same day as other local elections.

Summary

Election result

|-

Ward Results

Ashdon

Broad Oak & The Hallingsburys

Clavering

Debden & Wimbish

Elsenham & Henham

Felsted & Stebbing

Flitch Green & Little Dunmow

Great Dunmow North

Great Dunmow South & Barnston

Hatfield Heath

High Easter & Rodings

Littlebury, Chesterfords & Wenden Lofts

Newport

Saffron Walden Audley

Saffron Walden Castle

Saffron Walden Shire

Stansted North

Stansted South & Birchanger

Stort Valley

Takeley

Thaxted & The Eastons

The Sampfords

By-elections

Great Dunmow South & Barnston

References

Uttlesford District Council elections